This is a list of the first women lawyer(s) and judge(s) in Florida. It includes the year in which the women were admitted to practice law (in parentheses). Also included are women who achieved other distinctions such becoming the first in their state to graduate from law school or become a political figure.

Firsts in Florida's history

Law School 

 First female law graduate: Mary Stewart Howarth-Hewitt (c. 1908)

Lawyers 

First female: Louise R. Pinnell (1898) 
First Hispanic American female: Marian Borros (1926) 
 First African American female: Bernice Gaines (1958) 
 First Bangladeshi American (female): Zubaida Iqbal (2014) 
First female openly autistic: Haley Moss (2019)

State judges

 First female (judicial capacity): Bessie Bellinger in 1922
First female (judge): Edith Atkinson in 1924
First female (serve temporarily on the Florida District Court of Appeal and Florida Supreme Court) Rhea Grossman in 1971 and 1972 respectively 
First female (county court and circuit court): Susan H. Black in 1973 and 1975 respectively  
First female (appellate court): Anne C. Booth in 1978
First Hispanic American female (circuit court): Maria Korvick in 1981 
 First African American female: Leah Simms (1974) in 1981
 First Cuban American female: Margarita Esquiroz (1974) in 1984
 First (Arab American and Hispanic American) female (Florida Supreme Court): Rosemary Barkett (1970) in 1985
 First female (Fourth District Court of Appeal): Bobby W. Gunther in 1986
 First African American female (circuit court): Melvia Green in 1989 
 First (Arab American and Hispanic American) female (Florida Supreme Court; Chief Justice): Rosemary Barkett (1970) in 1992 
First African American female (Second District Court of Appeal): Peggy Quince (1975) in 1993  
First African American female (Fourth District Court of Appeal): Carole Y. Taylor (1974) in 1998 
First African American female (Florida Supreme Court): Peggy Quince (1975) in 1998 
First African American female (Thirteenth Judicial Circuit): Marva L. Crenshaw in 2000 
First openly lesbian female (circuit court): Victoria Sigler in 2000  
First African American female (Fifth Circuit Court): Sandra Edwards-Stephens in 2000  
First Cuban American female (Second District Court of Appeal): Virginia M. Hernandez Covington (1980) in 2001 
First African American (female) (First Judicial Circuit): Joyce H. Williams in 2005  
 First Colombian American (female): Catalina M. Avalos in 2005  
First Hispanic American (Cuban American) female (Third District Court of Appeals): Barbara Lagoa (1992) in 2006
 First Ethiopian American (female): Nina Ashenafi-Richardson in 2008  
 First African American female (Florida Supreme Court; Chief Justice): Peggy Quince (1975) in 2008  
First African American female (First District Court of Appeals): Nikki Clark in 2009  
 First Colombian American (female) elected: Diana Gonzalez-Whyte in 2012  
 First African American female (Second Judicial Circuit Court): Barbara Hobbs in 2012  
 First Cuban American female (Chief Circuit Judge; Eleventh Judicial Circuit): Bertila Soto (1986) in 2013 
First (Hispanic American) female (Twelfth Judicial Circuit): Maria Ruhl in 2019 
First Hispanic American (Cuban American) female (Florida Supreme Court): Barbara Lagoa (1992) in 2019  
First female (Chief Judge; Twelfth Judicial Circuit): Kimberly C. Bonner in 2019  
First Caribbean American (female) (justice-designate of the Florida Supreme Court until appointment was nullified): Renatha Francis in 2020  
First Haitian American (female) (Eleventh Circuit Court): Lody Jean in 2020 
First African American female (Seventh Judicial Circuit Court of Florida): Alicia Washington in 2020 
First Colombian American (female) (Ninth Judicial Circuit Court of Florida): Tarlika Nunez-Navarro in 2021

Federal judges 

 First female: Susan H. Black in 1979
 First African American female: Mary Scriven  
 First African American (female) (Administrative Law Judge): Eleanor Hunter  
 First female (United States District Court for the Southern District of Florida): Lenore Carrero Nesbitt (1960) in 1983
 First Cuban American female (United States District Court for the Southern District of Florida): Cecilia Altonaga (1983) in 2003

Attorney General of Florida 

First female: Pam Bondi (1990) in 2010

Assistant Attorney General of Florida 

 First female: Rebecca Bowles Hawkins (1935) in 1948

United States Attorney 

 First female (Middle District of Florida): Donna Bucella 
 First Hispanic American female (Middle District of Florida): Maria Chapa Lopez in 2018 
 First female (Southern District of Florida): Ariana Fajardo Orshan in 2018

State Attorney 

First female: Janet Reno (1963) in 1978 
First African American (female): Aramis Ayala in 2016

Assistant State Attorney 

 First female: Susan H. Black in 1969

County Attorney 

 First female: Annie Joe Law in 1928

Public Defender 

 First female: Barbara Linthicum (1989-1990)

Florida Bar Association 

 First female president: Patricia A. Seitz from 1993-1994

Firsts in local history
 Stacy A. Scott: First female Public Defender of the Eighth Judicial Circuit (2010) [Alachua, Baker, Bradford, Gilchrist, Levy and Union Counties, Florida]
 Susan C. Bucklew: First female appointed as a Judge of the Hillsborough County Superior Court (1982) and circuit court judge for the Thirteenth Judicial Circuit, Florida (1986)
 Lorelie P. Brannan: First female county court judge in Baker County, Florida (2022)
 Frances Ann Jamieson (1960): First female lawyer in Brevard County, Florida
Cathleen B. Clarke: First African American (female) judge in Brevard County, Florida (1998)
Angeline Weir (1960): First female County Solicitor in Broward County, Florida. She was also the first female President of the Broward County Bar Association (1983-1984).
Mildred S. Akerman (1956): First female elected judge in Broward County, Florida (1959)
 Elizabeth Athanasakos (1957): First female municipal judge in Broward County, Florida (1964–1974)
 Barbara Bridge (1964): First female judge of the County Court in Broward County, Florida (1972)
Mary Rudd-Robinson: First African American female judge in Broward County, Florida (1993)
Alison Smith: First Black female to serve as the President of the Broward County Bar Association (2021)
Cynthia Everett: First female (and African American) to serve as the City Attorney for Fort Lauderdale, Florida [Broward County, Florida]
Pauline Drake: First African American female to serve on the Fourth Judicial Circuit Court (1998) [Clay, Duval and Nassau Counties, Florida]
Kristina Mobley: First female county judge in Clay County, Florida (c. 2015)
Hixon Holley: First female judge in Collier County, Florida
Maria Ruhl: First Hispanic American female (and Hispanic American in general) appointed as a Judge of the Twelfth Judicial Circuit of Florida (2019) [DeSoto, Manatee, and Sarasota Counties, Florida]
Susan H. Black: First female to serve on the Duval County Court in Florida (1973-1975)
Bessie Bellinger: First female to act in a judicial position in Escambia County, Florida (1922)
Kathy Garner: First female (and African American) judge in Gadsden County, Florida (2009)
 Sheree H. Lancaster: First female judge in Gilchrist County, Florida
 Annie Joe Law: First female to serve as the County Attorney in Hernando County, Florida (1928)
Linda J. Treiman (1976): First female lawyer in Brooksville, Florida [Hernando County, Florida]
Mae Wood (c. 1896): First female lawyer in Hillsborough County, Florida
 Carolyn House Stewart: First African American female to serve as the Assistant State Attorney of the Thirteenth Judicial Circuit (1980) [Hillsborough County, Florida]
 Arthenia Joyner (1969): First African American female lawyer in Hillsborough County, Florida
 Josephine Howard Stafford: First female to serve on the  Municipal Court of Tampa, Florida (1958) [Hillsborough County, Florida]
Vivian Corvo: First Hispanic American female circuit judge in Hillsborough County, Florida
Marva Crenshaw: First African American female circuit judge in Hillsborough County, Florida
Julianne Holt: First female Public Defender of the Thirteenth Judicial Circuit [Hillsborough County, Florida]
Catherine McEwen: First female appointed as a U.S. bankruptcy judge in Tampa, Florida [Hillsborough County, Florida]
Marsha Rydberg: First female to serve as the President of the Hillsborough County Bar Association
Susan Johnson Velez: First African American female to serve as the President of Hillsborough County Bar Association (2013-2014)
Gwynne Young: First female to serve as the Assistant State Attorney in Hillsborough County, Florida
Nicole Menz: First female judge in Indian River County, Florida (2018)
Judith Hawkins: First African American (female) judge in Leon County, Florida
Cassandra Jackson: First African American female to serve as the City Attorney for Tallahassee, Florida [Leon County, Florida]
Barbara Linthicum and Nancy Daniels: First female Public Defenders respectively for Leon County, Florida
Edith Atkinson: First female judge in Dade County, Florida (1924)
Gwen Cherry (1965): First African American female lawyer in Dade County, Florida
Mattie Belle Davis: First female to serve on the Metropolitan Court of Dade County (1959), Florida
Janet Reno (1963): First female to serve as a State's Attorney in Miami-Dade County, Florida (1978)
Kathy Fernandez Rundle: First Cuban American (female) to serve as a State Attorney in Miami-Dade County, Florida (1993)
 Dixie L. Herlong Chastain: First female appointed as a judge of the Juvenile and Domestic Relations Court in Dade County, Florida. She was also the sixth female judge in Florida.
 Bertila Soto: First Hispanic American/Cuban American (female) to serve as the Chief Judge of the Eleventh Judicial Circuit in Miami-Dade County, Florida (2013)
Abigail Price Williams (1985): First female to serve as the County Attorney for Miami-Dade County, Florida (2015)
Lody Jean: First Haitian American (female) to serve on the  Miami-Dade County Court (2020)
Suzanne Bass: First female judge in Nassau County, Florida
Mary Sandefur Schulman (1943): First female lawyer in Okeechobee County, Florida
 Aramis Ayala: First African American (female) to serve as the State's Attorney of Orange County, Florida (2019)
LaShawnda K. Jackson: First Black (female) President of the Orange County Bar Association (2021)
Gabrielle Sanders: First African American female (and African American in general) judge in Osceola County, Florida (2019)
Anne E'del Deacon: First female municipal judge in Palm Beach, Florida and fifth female judge in Florida [Palm Beach County, Florida]
Catherine Brunson: First African American female lawyer to work for the Palm Beach County Attorney’s Office (1977), set up a law practice (1984), and to serve on the  Circuit Court in Palm Beach County (1994)
Sheree Davis Cunningham: First African American female judge in Palm Beach County, Florida
Rosalyn Sia Baker-Barnes: First African American female to serve as President of the Palm County Bar Association, Florida (2017)
Meenu Sasser: First Asian American (female) judge in Palm Beach County, Florida
Elizabeth Martin Leeman: First female lawyer to join the faculty of Stetson University School of Law (1970) [Pinellas County, Florida]
 Luz Nagle: First tenured Hispanic American (female) law professor at Stetson University College of Law (2004) [Pinellas County, Florida]
C. Bette Wimbish (1968): First African American female lawyer in Pinellas County, Florida
Catherine Harlan: First female county judge in Pinellas County, Florida
Miriam Irizarry: First Hispanic American female county court judge in Pinellas County, Florida
Elizabeth Kovachevich: First female elected as a circuit judge in Pinellas County, Florida
Michèle Alexandre: First African American (female) to serve as the Dean of Stetson University College of Law (2019)
Arthenia Joyner: First African American (female) lawyer in Polk County, Florida
Karla Foreman Wright: First African American female judge in Polk County, Florida (2000)
Mada Fraser Babcock McLendon: First female municipal judge in Lake Wales, Florida and third female judge in Florida [Polk County, Florida]
Mary Kennerly Buckles: First female judge in Putnam County, Florida and second female judge in Florida
Alicia Washington: First African American (female) judge to serve in Putnam County, Florida (2020)
Donna Goerner: First African American female judge in Seminole County, Florida (2020)
Peggy Elizabeth Ready: First female judge in St. Johns County, Florida as well as the county's first female assistant public defender
Joan Anthony: First African American female to preside over a family court in St. Johns County, Florida (2021)
Elsie O'Laughlin (1948): First female lawyer and judge in St. Lucie County, Florida
 Pamela Fort: First African American female lawyer in Fort Pierce, Florida [St. Lucie County, Florida]

See also  
 List of first women lawyers and judges in the United States
 Timeline of women lawyers in the United States
 Women in law

Other topics of interest 

 List of first minority male lawyers and judges in the United States
 List of first minority male lawyers and judges in Florida

References 

Lawyers, Florida, first
Florida, first
Florida, first
Women, Florida, first
Women, Florida, first
Women in Florida
Lists of people from Florida
Florida lawyers